Thrills is a Canadian brand of chewing gum. It was originally produced by the O-Pee-Chee company of London, Ontario, Canada which was subsequently bought by Nestle in the late 1980s. It is well known for its purple colour and its distinctive flavour.  Comparisons of its flavour to soap are so prevalent that recent packaging states "IT STILL TASTES LIKE SOAP!".

Thrills once came in a paper envelope or blister pack, but now come in a cardboard package similar to a Chiclets box. It is now made in Spain for Tootsie Roll Industries. There are ten pieces of gum in each package and each package has the dimensions of 22 x 9.8 x 4.7 cm.

References

Chewing gum